Gisella Perl (10 December 1907 – 16 December 1988) was a Hungarian Jewish gynecologist deported to Auschwitz concentration camp in 1944, where she helped hundreds of women, serving as an inmate gynecologist for them. She worked without the bare necessities for practicing medicine. Perl survived the Holocaust, emigrated to New York, and was one of the first women to publicize the Holocaust experience in English, in her 1948 memoir I Was a Doctor in Auschwitz. She became a specialist in infertility treatment at Mount Sinai Hospital, New York and eventually moved with her daughter to live in Herzliya, Israel, where she died.

Early life and education
Gisella Perl was born and grew up in Máramarossziget (now Sighetu Marmaţiei), then part of Hungary, which after the Trianon peace treaty of 1920 became part of Romania (and was again part of Hungary in 1940-44). In 1923, when she was 16, she graduated from secondary school first in her class, the only woman and the only Jew. Her father, Maurice Perl, refused to allow her to study medicine at first, because he feared she was going to "lose her faith and break away from Judaism". He relented a few months later.

Career
Perl became a successful and well known gynecologist in Sighetu Marmaţiei. She married an internist, Dr. Ephraim Krauss, and practiced until 1944, when Nazi Germany occupied her hometown during its invasion of Hungary and deported Perl to the Auschwitz concentration camp along with her family. Josef Mengele gave her the task to work as a gynecologist within the women's camp, attending to inmates without bare necessities such as antiseptics, clean wipes, or running water.

She is best known for temporarily saving the lives of hundreds of women by aborting their pregnancies, as pregnant women were often beaten and killed or used by Dr. Josef Mengele for vivisections.

She was transferred to Bergen-Belsen, her final Holocaust destination, and soon liberated. She found that her husband, only son, her parents and her extended family had all been murdered in the Holocaust. She tried to commit suicide by poisoning herself and was sent to recuperate in a convent in France until 1947.

In March 1947 she arrived in New York City on a temporary visa to lecture, sponsored by the Hungarian-Jewish Appeal and the United Jewish Appeal. She moved to an upper class neighborhood in New York. New York Representative Sol Bloom unsuccessfully petitioned the Justice Department for permanent residency of the United States.

On March 12, 1948, President Truman signed a bill allowing Perl to stay in the US.  The INS interrogated her on suspicion of assisting the Nazi doctors of Auschwitz in carrying out human rights abuses. In 1948, Eleanor Roosevelt convinced her to start practicing medicine again. She began work as a gynecologist at Mount Sinai Hospital, New York, starting as the only female phsyician in labor and delivery, and becoming a specialist in infertility treatment. In 1951, at the age of 44 she was granted U.S. citizenship. 

Perl was the sole author or coauthor of nine papers on vaginal infections published between 1955 and 1972.

I was a doctor in Auschwitz
In June 1948, Gisella Perl published the story of her incarceration at Auschwitz, detailing the horrors she encountered as an inmate gynecologist. The book was titled  I Was a Doctor in Auschwitz and included Perl's description of operations on young women's breasts without anesthetics, using a knife as her only instrument. She described Irma Grese, a 19 year old Aufseherin or warden from Auschwitz who observed the procedures and derived pleasure from their suffering. She wrote that Grese's “face [was] clear and angelic and her blue eyes the gayest, the most innocent eyes one can imagine.” Her words helped paint a picture of Grese when the notorious guard was put on trial and subsequently executed.

Perl's memoir was one of at least eight similar accounts by female prisoners, corroborated by the testimonies of other women.

The infirmary encounters with Irma Grese had first been described by Olga Lengyel, a Hungarian Jewish woman and surgical assistant imprisoned at Auschwitz, in her 1947 book Five Chimneys, originally published in French. Lengyel was the first survivor to have her testimony published in English, wrote Zoë Waxman.

Perl's account of the treatments was virtually identical in every detail to the court testimony of Dr. Olga Sulima, an inmate physician at Auschwitz from the Soviet Union, according to historian Bernard Braxton.

Personal life and death
Perl was later reunited with her daughter, Gabriella Krauss Blattman, whom she managed to hide during the war. In 1979, both moved to live in Herzliya, Israel. Perl died in Israel on December 16, 1988, at the age of 81.

Publications
In 2003, a film entitled Out of the Ashes was released.  It was based upon the story of Dr. Perl's life, and starred Christine Lahti as Dr. Perl.

References

External links
Gisella Perl: Angel and Abortionist in the Auschwitz Death Camp  holocaust-history.org
Gisella Perl novelguide.com 
Roni Peleg.Profiles: Dr. Gisella Perl Journal of Women's Health. September 2005, 14(7): 588-591. https://doi.org/10.1089/jwh.2005.14.588 

1907 births
1988 deaths
People from Sighetu Marmației
Hungarian Jews
Romanian Jews
American autobiographers
American gynecologists
American people of Hungarian-Jewish descent
Israeli people of Hungarian-Jewish descent
Hungarian emigrants to the United States
Hungarian emigrants to Israel
Hungarian gynaecologists
World War II civilian prisoners
Bergen-Belsen concentration camp survivors
Abortion providers
Auschwitz concentration camp survivors
Women autobiographers
20th-century Romanian women writers
20th-century Romanian writers
Jewish concentration camp survivors
Hungarian women physicians
20th-century Hungarian physicians
20th-century American women physicians
20th-century American physicians
Women gynaecologists